Herxheim am Berg is an Ortsgemeinde – a municipality belonging to a Verbandsgemeinde, a kind of collective municipality – in the Bad Dürkheim district in Rhineland-Palatinate, Germany.

Geography

Location 
The municipality lies in the Palatinate on the German Wine Route. Herxheim am Berg belongs to the Verbandsgemeinde of Freinsheim, whose seat is in the like-named town.

History 
In 774, the municipality had its first documentary mention as Heriesheim.

The municipality's landmark is the roughly one-thousand-year-old Evangelical church of St Jacob (St. Jakobskirche). The building contains the lower section of a quire tower with a groin-vaulted chancel onto which is built a semicircular apse. The church was built about 1014, making it one of the Palatinate's oldest ecclesiastical buildings. The nave dates to 1729. In the chancel, wall paintings have been brought to light showing the Four Evangelists, both in human shape with wings and with the heads of their symbols. In the apse's vaulting there was a representation of the Last Judgement, and on the south wall, one can see the Apostle Paul. The paintings were done in the latter half of the 14th century.

The church tower contains a bell installed in 1934 and bearing a swastika and an inscription to Adolf Hitler. In 2018, after a complaint by the organist and an offer by the regional church organisation to replace the bell, the parish council voted to retain it as a memorial with an explanatory plaque.

Politics

Municipal council 
The council is made up of twelve councillors, elected for a five-year term of office, who were last elected at a local election on 25 May 2014. The chairman has the title of mayor.

The municipal elections of 2004, 2009, and 2014 yielded the following results:

Coat of arms 
The German blazon reads: In Rot auf grünem Dreiberg eine aufgerichtete silberne Hacke mit goldenem Stiel.

The municipality's arms might in English heraldic language be described thus: Gules issuant from a mount of three vert a hoe palewise argent with handle Or, the blade to dexter.

Herxheim's oldest village seal comes from about 1500 and already shows the hoe, whose meaning is unknown. The triple green mountains – a charge called a Dreiberg in German heraldry – may refer to the municipality's geographical location (the epithet “am Berg” means “at the mountain”). Some later seals had a different composition with the letter H between two roses, but when actual arms were adopted, the old composition was chosen.

The arms have been borne since 5 August 1960.

Famous people

Sons and daughters of the town 
 Herman Baer (1830-1901), American author
 Eduard Eppelsheimer (1808–1866), politician

Famous people associated with the municipality 
 Werner Holz, painter

References

External links 

Herxheim am Berg at the German Wine Route’s website 

Bad Dürkheim (district)